The 1984 World Junior Ice Hockey Championships (1984 WJHC) was the eighth edition of the Ice Hockey World Junior Championship.  It was held from December 25, 1983, to January 3, 1984, in Norrköping and Nyköping, Sweden.  The Soviet Union won its second consecutive gold medal and sixth overall.  Finland won silver and Czechoslovakia bronze.

Pool A
The 1984 tournament was a round-robin format, with the top three teams winning gold, silver and bronze medals respectively.

Final standings

 was relegated to Pool B for the 1985 World Junior Ice Hockey Championships.

Results

Scoring leaders

Tournament awards

Pool B
The second tier was contested from March 19–25, in Caen, France.  Eight teams were divided into two round robin groups where the top two, and bottom two, graduated to meet their respective opponents in a final round robin.  Results between competitors who migrated together were carried forward.

Preliminary round

Group A

Group B

Final Round
Promotion Group

Poland was promoted to Pool A for 1985.

Relegation Group

Denmark was Demoted to Pool C for 1985.

Pool C
This year, Pool C used the same format as Pool B.  It was played in Varese Italy from March 25 to 31.  Seven countries participated along with a second Italian team that received no official ranking.  British and Spanish junior teams made their debut this year.

Group A

Group B

Final Round
Promotion Group

Italy was promoted to Pool B for 1985.

Consolation Group

References

 
1984 World Junior Hockey Championships at TSN
 Results at passionhockey.com

World Junior Ice Hockey Championships
World Junior Ice Hockey Championships
International ice hockey competitions hosted by Sweden
December 1983 sports events in Europe
January 1984 sports events in Europe
Sports competitions in Norrköping
Sports competitions in Nyköping
Sport in Caen
March 1984 sports events in Europe
1983–84 in French ice hockey
International ice hockey competitions hosted by France
Sport in Varese
International ice hockey competitions hosted by Italy
1983–84 in Italian ice hockey